Hayfield Secondary School is a secondary school (grades 7–12) in the Fairfax County Public Schools system of Virginia.  It opened in 1968 and graduated its first senior class in 1971.

History
The land that Hayfield Secondary sits on was at one time part of George Washington's Mount Vernon estate.  Because of a small natural spring underneath the school, the land served as a hay field.  The land itself changed hands numerous times, until 1956 when developers constructed the nearby Hayfield Farm Community, the first of many housing developments in the region.  Hayfield Secondary opened its doors to middle school (7th and 8th grade) students as well as 9-10th grades during the 1968–1969 school year, while still under construction. Floyd W. Worley was the first principal.

The school is erroneously mentioned in Remember the Titans as being "all white."  While at the time of the desegregation of the City of Alexandria's T.C. Williams High School, a large majority of Hayfield's students were white, it was racially integrated from the day of its first opening in 1968, drawing the majority of its students of color from the children of military men and women at nearby Fort Belvoir, home to the U.S. Army Corps of Engineers. The desegregation encouraging word "Diversity" even headed a section of the '73 yearbook, the fifth volume of the "Harvester."

As the region which it serves grew, overcrowding became a major issue at Hayfield, and by the late 1990s it routinely exceeded its intended capacity with 4000+ students. A renovation of the school began in 2002 and was completed in 2005.  Further helping to relieve the pressure on Hayfield was the opening of South County Secondary School, also in 2005. However, due to overcrowding at South County in its second year of operation and under-utilized capacity at Hayfield, Hayfield accommodated more students again from a boundary change with South County approved for the 2007–2008 school year.

In 2022, the school's varsity boys basketball team completed a perfect season (32-0) and beat Battlefield High School, 67-47, in the Virginia High School League Class 6 State Championship. This was the school's first state title in basketball.

Academics
Hayfield is a secondary school, meaning it serves grades 7 through 12, but the high school and middle school students are generally kept separated.  The middle school has an honors program and the high school offers both honors and Advanced Placement courses. As of Spring 2007, the number of exams on which a score of 3 or higher was achieved (on a scale of 1–5) rose to 57% from 46% the previous year, the best results found on record for Hayfield.

Hayfield has an It's Academic Team and a Robotics Team that has been in the FIRST Robotics Competition (FRC).  Hayfield's Varsity Science Olympiad team competes in several regional tournaments.  The school competes in the Intel International Science and Engineering Fair. The school is home to a Latin Club which is part of the Junior Latin Classical League. 

Hayfield also has an orchestra, a band and a choral group.

Athletics
Hayfield's high school teams compete in the 6A Gunston District of the 6A Occoquan Region of the Virginia High School League. The school's mascot is the hawk and the school color is orange.  Sports offered include:

Cheerleading 
Cross country (boys and girls)
Football
Dance Team
Field hockey
Golf (boys and girls)
Volleyball
Basketball (boys and girls)
Gymnastics
Indoor track (boys and girls)
Swimming
Wrestling
Baseball
Lacrosse (boys and girls)
Soccer (boys and girls)
Softball
Outdoor track (boys and girls)
Tennis (boys and girls)

Notable alumni
Murielle Ahouré, class of 2005. Sprinter for Ivory Coast.
Larry Asante, class of 2005. Football safety for the Oakland Raiders of the National Football League At Hayfield, he earned all-league honors as a running back in the AAA Patriot Division.
Matthew Ashford, Actor best known for portraying the role of Jack Deveraux on the NBC soap opera Days of Our Lives.
Peter Baker, Chief White House correspondent for The New York Times.
Mike D'Orso, class of 1971. Narrative nonfiction writer, national bestsellers, notable awards.
Margaret Fetterolf, was murdered in 1976 while in attendance at the school; identified in September 2021
GoldLink, rapper
Tony Mayberry, played football for the Tampa Bay Buccaneers from 1990 to 1999.
Swati Mohan, class of 2000, NASA's Mars 2020 Guidance, Navigation, and Controls Operations Lead (NASA Jet Propulsion Lab). She landed the Mars Perseverance Rover on Mars on February 18, 2021.

Facility
Hayfield's Rebecca S. Wilburn Auditorium is one of the largest auditoriums in Northern Virginia, and includes an orchestra pit elevator lift built into the front of the stage that allows that portion of the stage to act as either an orchestra pit or stage extension. Technical support for the Wilburn Auditorium is supported by a student organization, the Hayfield Audio and Lighting Technicians ("HALT").

Planetarium
Hayfield Secondary's Planetarium opened its doors in 1969. The main instrument of the planetarium is the Spitz A-4 projector. Many special effect projectors are also used to demonstrate certain astronomical and atmospheric phenomena, such as lunar and solar eclipses, different types of lightning, auroras, and the phasing of the moon. The planetarium is also equipped with three Kodak Ektograph projectors, and a slide dissolve system which is used to show previously produced slide programs and to create special slide programs on current astronomical topics. The most recent additions to the equipment list is a video projector and a special effects projector.

References

Public high schools in Virginia
Secondary schools in Fairfax County, Virginia
Northern Virginia Scholastic Hockey League teams
Educational institutions established in 1968
Public middle schools in Virginia
1968 establishments in Virginia